The Lingshui Lake is a lake in Lieyu Township, Kinmen County, Taiwan.

History
The lake used to be a lowland area and dry lake since Yuan Dynasty. The production of the salt was discontinued in 1946. In 1963, the Republic of China Armed Forces dug the area and converted into a freshwater lake with three levees to prevent the area from flooding.

Geology
It forms a swamp for the habitat of fishes, ducks and migratory birds around the area.

See also
 Geography of Taiwan

References

1963 establishments in Taiwan
Lakes of Kinmen County
Lieyu Township